This is a list of wars involving the Arab Republic of Syria since independence, including periods of the Arab Kingdom of Syria (1920), Mandatory Syrian Republic, Syrian Republic (1946–63), United Arab Republic (1958–61) and Ba'athist Syria.

See also
 Syrian Crisis of 1957

References

 
Syria
Wars
Wars